CKWF-FM is a radio station in Peterborough, Ontario, Canada, broadcasting at 101.5 FM, with an active rock format branded as "The Wolf 101.5". The station is owned by Corus Entertainment.

History
The station began broadcasting in 1947 as CHEX-FM. In 1976, the call letters were changed to CFMP-FM ("FMP" stands for FM Peterborough). Over the years since CHEX-FM went on the air in the 1940s, the station went through a number of ownerships, technical and format changes. On February 14, 1992, the station became The Wolf, adopting a rock format and changed its call letters to CKWF-FM. In January 1998, the transmitter tower for CKWF-FM, as well as sister station CHEX-DT was severely damaged to due ice buildup on the structure. A new 1000-foot TV-FM tower was built beside the old one in 2003.

The original studio and office complex for CKWF and its sister stations were beside the transmission tower on Television Road, on the east end of the city. Due to concerns about the stability of the tower, the studios were relocated in 1999 to downtown Peterborough, at the corner of King St and George St. They are accessible to both listeners and performers.

Notable announcers
John Badham, 1988 to 2011

References

External links
The Wolf 101.5

Kwf
Kwf
Kwf
Radio stations established in 1947
1947 establishments in Ontario